Near East University Hospital is the largest and one of the leading medical facilities in North Nicosia, Northern Cyprus. It is affiliated with the Near East University Faculty of Medicine.

History
Near East University Hospital officially opened its doors to public on 20 July 2010 with a grand opening party that hosted Turkish Minister of Justice, Cemil Cicek, and Turkish Republic of Northern Cyprus President Dervis Eroglu.

Facilities
The NEU Hospital has a 55,000 square-meter closed area with 209 private single patient rooms, 8 operating theatres, 30-bed Intensive Care Unit, 17-bed Neonatal Intensive Care Unit, laboratories and a cutting-edge diagnostic imaging center. To fulfil the diverse needs of the international patients an "International Patient Coordination Center" has been created. This facility arranges and coordinates the transfer of international patients and their companions to and from North Cyprus.

Landmarks
 Near East University Faculty of Medicine accepted to World Health Organization Avicenna Directories.
 Business Initiative Directions 2013 International Arch of Europe Award, a vanity award

References

External links

Hospital buildings completed in 2010
Hospitals established in 2010
Hospitals in Northern Cyprus
Buildings and structures in North Nicosia
Near East University